This is a list of Malaysian billionaires based on an annual assessment of wealth and assets compiled and published by Forbes magazine in 2022.

2022 Malaysian billionaires list

See also
 The World's Billionaires
 List of countries by the number of billionaires

References

Malaysians
 
Net worth
Wealth in Malaysia